Robert David "Roy" Adam (11 March 1883 – 3 November 1958) was an Australian rules footballer who played two games for St Kilda Football Club in 1901 and later returned to the Victorian Football League in 1904–1905, playing 12 games for Melbourne and kicking three goals, all in 1904.

References

External links

 
Demonwiki profile

1883 births
1958 deaths
St Kilda Football Club players
Melbourne Football Club players
Australian rules footballers from Victoria (Australia)